Hydnellum versipelle is a species of tooth fungus in the family Bankeraceae. It was originally described by Elias Fries in 1861 as Hydnum versipelle. Taisiya Lvovna Nikolayeva transferred it to the genus Sarcodon in 1961. Hydnum crassum, published by Kenneth A. Harrison in 1961, is a synonym. The species is found in Europe and North America.

References

External links

Fungi described in 1861
Fungi of Europe
Fungi of North America
versipelle
Taxa named by Elias Magnus Fries